Chatkhil Panch Gaon Government High School is a government higher secondary school. It is located in Chatkhil town of Chatkhil, Noakhali District, Bangladesh. The school was established in 1907.

Facilities
The school has four large buildings. There is a big field in the school arena. There are 25 teachers and other facilities include big auditorium,a pond, canteen, shaheed minar, modern library, upazilla science club, modern computer lab and it provides modern equipments of lesson. The school has enriched science laboratories. Also the authority of the school organize morning assembly, annual sports and games, annual prize giving ceremony.

Sections
Initially the school conducted only one shift.  Presently all the classes from 6 to 10 are running. There are two sections in each of the classes: A and B.

Uniform
Boys: The uniform is a white shirt with white full pant and white shoes and black belt. The school monogram should contain on shoulder. Girls: The uniform is a navy blue frock, white Payjama and white Orna.

Admission
Usually students are admitted in class 6. Admission can be considered in other classes if a vacancy is available or if someone is transferred from some other government school. The admission test is usually taken in the first week of January.

Curriculum
This high school follows the national education curriculum of Bangladesh. The curriculum includes  secondary  academic subjects. Classes in computing are compulsory for grades 6–10. Students of secondary (9 and 10)  classes elect to one of two major groups : Business Studies and Science.

Extracurricular activities
 Scouting
 Red Crescent functions
 Games and sports (Cricket, Football, Badminton)
 Debating
 Science fair
 Cultural and Religious Programmes
 Study tour

References

Schools in Noakhali District
1907 establishments in India
Educational institutions established in 1907
Chatkhil Upazila